Richard Lee Compton (born April 16, 1940) is a former American football player who played for Detroit Lions, Pittsburgh Steelers of the National Football League (NFL) and Houston Oilers of the American Football League (AFL). He played college football at McMurry University.

References

1940 births
Living people
Detroit Lions players
Pittsburgh Steelers players
Houston Oilers players
American Football League players
People from Colorado City, Texas